Naoya Gamou (蒲生尚弥 - Gamou Naoya; born November 11, 1989) is a Japanese professional racing driver.

Complete Super GT Results 
(key) (Races in bold indicate pole position) (Races in italics indicate fastest lap)

References 

1989 births
Living people
Japanese racing drivers
Super GT drivers

TOM'S drivers
Toyota Gazoo Racing drivers
Nürburgring 24 Hours drivers
KCMG drivers
Japanese Formula 3 Championship drivers